EISP may refer to:

English for Integrated Studies Project
The English International School of Padua
English International School Prague
Exercise-induced sexual pleasure